The Islamic Azad University, Tehran Dental Branch (Persian: دانشگاه آزاد اسلامی واحد دندانپزشکی تهران) is a university located in Tehran, Iran, that is a branch of the Islamic Azad University, which is dedicated to the study of Dentistry. The Dental School campus includes two separate buildings, located in the north of Tehran. Currently, it is the largest non-governmental Dental School in Iran, accepting students for undergraduate and postgraduate levels of study.

Main website:

See also
Islamic Azad University

Educational institutions established in 1986
tehran dental|Tehran-Dental
Universities in Tehran
Dental schools